Blacksburg Transit, or simply BT, is a local government-owned urban-suburban bus line based in Blacksburg, Virginia. The system originated in 1983 with six buses, but has since expanded its operation to 53 fixed-route buses and 18 body-on-chassis vehicles. In FY 19, Ridership exceeded 4.6 million passenger trips per year; ridership is dominated by Virginia Tech students who account for approximately 90 percent of all riders, with the remaining percentage being split between Virginia Tech faculty and staff, and other Blacksburg citizens. Ridership decreased in FY20 and FY21 due to COVID-19, but began rebounding in FY21. Blacksburg Transit serves the towns of Blacksburg, Christiansburg and limited portions of Montgomery County.

System of the Year 
In 2019, BT was named the American Public Transportation Association's Outstanding Public Transportation System for agencies carrying fewer than 4 million passenger trips per year. BT was singled out for their successful delivery of service to Virginia Tech, Blacksburg and Christiansburg based on performance on 24 quantitative and qualitative criteria, including ridership. In the three years evaluated (2016, 2017 and 2018), BT experienced an unprecedented 22 percent growth in ridership from 3.5 to 4.3 million passenger trips per year.

Employees 

The majority of BT's drivers are part-time employees, making BT a popular employer with Virginia Tech students as well as retirees. The majority of the service's full-time staff consists of administrative and supervisory positions.

BT Access 
BT Access is Blacksburg Transit's complementary paratransit service. The service is available for persons with a temporary or permanent disability who meet the criteria established under the Americans with Disabilities Act. Once approved, riders can schedule one time or recurring trips with door-to-door service to any destination within Blacksburg. Riders wishing to go to Christiansburg can schedule a trip to meet the Two Town Trolley at its Squires Hall timecheck or at LewisGale Hospital Montgomery.

Routes

Route schedules and maps 
Blacksburg Service
 Carpenter Boulevard (CRB)
 Corporate Research Center Shuttle (CRC)
 Harding Avenue (HDG)
 Hethwood A & B (HWA / HWB)
 Hokie Express (HXP)
 South Main – Airport Rd (MSA)
 Main Street North & Givens Lane (MSG)
 Main Street North & South (MSN / MSS)
 Patrick Henry Drive (PHD)
 Patrick Henry B (PHB)
 Progress Street (PRO)
 Toms Creek (TOM)
 Two Town Trolley (TTT)
 University City Boulevard (UCB)

Christiansburg Service
 Explorer Blue & Gold (BLU / GLD)
 Go Anywhere

Fixed-Route Bus Fleet

See also 
Transportation in Virginia

References

External links 
 Official website

Virginia Tech
Bus transportation in Virginia
Blacksburg, Virginia
Transportation in Montgomery County, Virginia
Transport companies established in 1983
1983 establishments in Virginia